Aberdeen F.C. competed in the Scottish Football League Division One in 1914–15.

Overview

Aberdeen finished in 14th place out of 20 in Scottish Division One. There was no Scottish Cup in this season due to the First World War, though league football continued. Sam Cail finished as the club's top scorer with nine goals.

Results

Scottish Division One

Final standings

Scottish Cup

There was no Scottish Cup this season due to the competition being suspended because of the First World War.

Squad

Appearances & Goals

|}

References

Aberdeen F.C. seasons
Aberdeen